Skyscrapers of Ukraine are high-rise residential and office buildings in Ukraine. Until 2009, skyscrapers in Ukraine considered buildings higher than 74 meters, now – 100 meters.

The largest cities with a cluster of skyscrapers are Kyiv, Dnipro, Donetsk, Odesa, Kharkiv.

The first skyscraper on the territory of Ukraine was built in Kyiv in 1912, it was a 12-storey . The next big leap into high-rise construction was the Kharkiv skyscrapers: 13-storey Derzhprom (1928) with 68 meters and 14-story Project House (1932) with 68.5 meters.

During the USSR, it was forbidden to build residential buildings with conditional height (floor level of the last residential floor) higher than 73.5 m, but 5 skyscrapers were built contrary to the law – Trade House, Hotel "Tourist" and Ministry of Infrastructure House in Kyiv, and two "tall buildings" of housing estate "Victory" in Dnipro. In addition, several other skyscrapers began to be built in Soviet times: the KyivTV-center and the House of the USSR Ministry of Melioration in Kyiv, and the «Parus» Hotel in the Dnipro. The TV-center was completed in 1992, the House of USSR Ministry of Melioration was completed in 2006 in the form of an appellate court, and the construction of the «Parus» Hotel in Dnipro was finally halted in 1995, leaving 80% ready.

The jump to high-rise construction began in the late 1990s when the law on high-rise construction was declared invalid and the state's economy made it possible to construct large-scale buildings; since then, more than 30 homes over 100 meters have been built in the country.

It is planned to construct skyscrapers in the country over 300 meters high.

In the long-term plans is the construction of the skyscrapers of Kyiv, Dnipro, Donetsk, Kharkiv and other major cities of Ukraine.

In 2007–2015, the 214-meter multifunctional complex "Sky Towers" was constructing in Kyiv, which is to become the first building in Ukraine to cross the 200-meter mark. Today the building is suspended.

Plans include 53-story "Victory Towers" (now a 36-story residential complex "Manhattan City" is under construction), a 45-story complex in Protasiv Yar, a 60-story "Cadetsky Gai" Center in Kyiv, a 54-story multifunctional complex "Brama" in the Dnipro.

The project of a large-scale business center "Kyiv-City" on the Rybalsky Island, where skyscrapers could stand 200–300 meters in height, is still unrealized. Now "Rybalsky" residential complex is under construction. The project was moved to the territory of the 11th residential district of the Poznyaki-Western and is frozen at the design stage.

Ukrainian skyscrapers in culture and art 

For the first time the Ukrainian skyscraper was advertised as an architectural value in 1912, it was the Ginzburg Skyscraper which was named "giant" in the travel guide "Companion in the City of Kiyv".

Later, in 1929, the skyscraper was chosen for the filming of the experimental movie "Man with a Movie Camera".

In the 1930s Kharkiv Derzhprom gained even more fame. The 63-meter skyscraper appeared in the Soviet film Dziga Vetrov "Three Songs About Lenin" as a symbol of modernity. The building was then used in patriotic communist videos. The main emphasis in these videotapes was on the record high-rise building in then Soviet Union.

In addition to videotapes, Derzhprom was described in many poems and works by famous Ukrainian and foreign writers.

A similar patriotic clip about Kiyv in 1983 include the Trade House and the Hotel "Kyiv". [50]

Ukrainian skyscrapers are also noticed on tourist maps, where they are depicted on same level with historical sites. [51]

Since 2007, when Parus Business Center was become very popular, the skyscraper has appeared in many commercials, music videos, TV shows and the Ukrainian film Oleksandr Kiriyenko "Illusion of Fear", as well as in promotional videos of Ukraine for Euro 2012.

Long-term construction projects 

The problem of skyscraper construction is the "freezing" of projects (stopping construction due to underfunding), many Ukrainian high-rise buildings are unfinished and this issue became a major problem during the 2008–2009 economic crisis.

Such well-known skyscrapers are:

 Dnipro Towers – a complex consisting of six 35-story towers with a height of 110 meters in Kyiv. Skyscrapers have been under construction since 2000.
"Mirax Plaza" – 46-storey, 192-meter skyscraper in Kyiv. Construction has been ongoing since 2006. Construction has been restored since 2016, but now a 28-story residential complex "Mirax" is being built at this place.
Multifunctional complex "Congress Hall" – 27-storey, the 106-meter skyscraper in Donetsk. Construction has been ongoing since 2006.

History of skyscrapers of Ukraine

Bell towers 

The history of skyscrapers of Ukraine began 110 years ago, but high-rise construction in Ukraine was mastered in the fourteenth century. The first skyscrapers of Ukraine were not the houses, but the bell towers.

The first tall bell tower in the territory of modern Ukraine appeared in Lviv, it was the Kornyakt tower, part of the architectural ensemble of the Assumption Church. After the completion of the 4th tier in 1695 with a total height of 65.8 m, it became the tallest structure of Ukraine. Even today, the building remains one of the tallest in the city. In the tower there is a famous bell - "Kyrylo", which at one time was the largest bell of Galicia. In Kiyv, the first "high-rise" was the famous Great Lavra Bell Tower – a 97-meter building, which was erected in 1745. Construction of the Lavra Bell Tower lasted 13 years. Another Kiyv high-rise bell tower was built in 1853 for the Saint Sophia Cathedral. The Saint Sofia Bell Tower is 76 meters high.
Also, an altitude bell tower was built in 1833 in Kharkiv in honor of the Russian Empire's victory over the Napoleonic Army, it was the Assumption Belltower 90 meters high.

In 1899, a grand project was launched in Kiyv – to build the highest bell tower in the Russian Empire at the Trinity Monastery on Zvirynets. The planned height of the building was 110 meters, but for many different reasons (mainly because of the protests of the Kyiv-Pechersk monks and the World War I), this bell tower was not completed. Only the first tier was built but later it was dismantled into building materials.

First skyscrapers (1901–1940) 

For the first time a high-rise building in Ukraine was built in 1900–1901 in Kyiv, it was "Kyiv Paris" – an 8-storey skyscraper (6 main, attic and underground) with a spire 46 meters high. For the first time in this building, an elevator was installed in Ukraine. The building was used as revenue house, owned and built by builder-contractor Lev Ginzburg.

In 1912, Ginzburg built Ginzburg Skyscraper near "Kyiv Paris". The architects were Adolf Minkus and Fedor Troupiansky from Odesa. The 12-story building was truly different against the backdrop of the city, with a spire of 67.5 meters in height. The skyscraper struck with its novelty, it had 94 apartments, about 500 rooms, a mall on the ground floor and modern forged elevators at that time. In addition to its 67-meter height, the house seemed even taller because it stood on a hill. 

The building was so amazing and tall that pilgrims from other cities prayed before the building, thinking it was some kind of temple. In the days of the World War II, Ivan Kudrya, a Soviet spy, lived in this skyscraper. Until now, the house has not survived, it was blown up on 24 September 1941, by the Red Army, and completely dismantled in the early 1950s, during the construction of Hotel Ukraine.

In 1921, the first Lviv skyscraper was built – the Sprecher House, which was a 7-story revenue house. It was owned by the richest businessman in Lviv, Jonah Sprecher. It is the first house in Lviv to be equipped with two high-speed electric elevators.

Another multi-story building was built in Kiyv before World War II, it was the famous Cabinet of Ministers of Ukraine, which has 10 floors and a height of 58 meters (67 meters with a spire). The construction of the building lasted from 1936 to 1938, the chief architect was Ivan Fomin. This building still remains the largest and one of the tallest administrative buildings in the city. It is the first high-rise of the "Stalin Empire". Until 1991, it was the House of Council of People's Commissars of USSR (Radnarkom).

The last "pre-war" high-rise was Kiyv's 10-story constructivist UVO House on Arsenal Square, built according to the plan of Ukrainian architect Joseph Karakis in 1934–1940. The height of the building reached about 35 meters.

Constructivist Kharkiv (1928–1941) 

A major step in the high-rise construction was the construction of three "high-rises" on the Dzerzhinsky Square in the then capital of the Ukrainian SSR – Kharkiv.

It all began in 1926, when Derzhprom  – the first Kharkov skyscraper – began to be laid. They built this giant complex with the help of primitive means: shovels, stretchers, wheelbarrows. In 1928 Derzhprom was ready, it struck with its scale – 13 floors, 68 meters high and 12 elevators. Dozens of writers have described this building in their works.

In 1932, the construction of the Project House (today – the main building of V.N. Karazin Kharkiv National University) was completed. The skyscraper project won an architectural competition called "Catch up and overtake!." The constructed building stood even higher than the Derzhprom (68.5 meters high and 14 floors high). After damage during World War II, the building was reconstructed, depriving itself of its first design constructivist appearance. Until 1952, the building remained the tallest skyscraper in the USSR, until Kotelnicheskaya Embankment Building was built in Moscow.

The building of the Cooperative House was completed in 1954, which was partly due to the partial destruction in times of World War II. The building has 12 floors and is almost 60 meters high. It was originally planned that the building of the Government House of Ukraine Soviet Republic would be located in the building. But it was given to the Department of Agriculture. Since 1934, the half-built skyscraper was given to the military. At the beginning of the 21st century. the building was transferred under the northern building of V.N. Karazin Kharkiv National University.

Another architectural skyscraper, which is not part of the "three Kharkiv high-rises", was built in 1932–1936, it was a Hotel "Kharkiv" (8 floors; ~ 45 m tall).

Kharkiv can be considered the first city in Ukraine where the "skyline" of skyscrapers appeared. All four buildings (in the first plan) had a constructivist architectural style. The city square had the most urban appearance of the entire USSR.

High-rises in period of afterwar reconstruction (1943–1953) 
During World War II, 1941, when German troops occupied Kyiv, Soviet troops completely demolished Khreshchatyk and other streets during the retreat. In 1943, after the city was repulsed by the Red Army, this street began to rebuild.

The first high-rises of post-war times were: 9-storey "tower with a spire" on the Khreshchatyk 13/2 (1950–1951 years of construction), 11-story buildings on Khreshchatyk, 23 and 27, built-in 1952–1953, and an 11-story building on Klovsky Uzviz Street, 17, built-in 1953. They all had a height of about 35–40 meters.

The "Stalin high-rises" in Ukraine (1954–1961) 

During the post-war reconstruction of the cities of the USSR, there were exceptions when in the large Soviet cities began to appear "Stalin skyscrapers" – high-rises in the style of "Stalin's Empire". The largest high-rise construction was undergone by Moscow, but in the cities of Ukraine, there were three high-rises: a high-rise residential building on Khreshchatyk Street, 25, a "Moscow" Hotel and a House with Spire.

The first high-rise of the "Stalin Empire" in the USSR was built in 1950–1954 in Kharkiv, it was the House with Spire. The building has 11 floors and a high tower with a spire. By 1967, two more residential buildings had been completed. Today, this building is part of the "7 Architectural Wonders of Kharkiv".

The first "Stalin high-rise" reconstruction of Khreshchatyk in Kyiv was the high-rise residential building on Khreshchatyk, 25, which was built from 1953 to 1954. The complex already had 15 floors, a tower and a spire about 73 meters high with a tower, and 85 with a spire.

The tallest building of Ukraine could be the Kiyv Hotel "Moscow" (since 2001, the Hotel Ukraine), which was supposed to be 21 stories high and reach a height of 120–150 meters, but by order of the USSR Council, the project of the Moscow Hotel was cut off. The hotel was built from 1954 until 1961. In the cropped version, the hotel reached only 16 floors and 66 meters in height. The building still adorns the main metropolitan square – Maidan Nezalezhnosti. The plans of the ex-chief architect of Kiyv Serhiy Babushkin left the idea of reconstruction of the hotel, on the site of the hotel "Ukraine" it is envisaged to build a skyscraper with a height of about 210 meters – 67 levels above ground and 7 underground levels.

Hotels-skyscrapers (1970–1980) 
Ukraine's new step in high-rise construction was the construction of modern multi-story hotels. The first such "skyscraper" was built in 1970, the three-star hotel "Lybid" in Kiyv. The hotel has 19 floors and is 62 meters high. The building became a symbol of the modern capital of the USSR, the skyscraper photos were printed in Kiyv tourist guides and postcards.

In general, several high-rise hotels were built in 1972–1989 in Kyiv: hotel «Slavutych" (17-floor; 58 m), hotel "Kiyv" (22-floor; 80 m), Hotel "Rus" (22-floor, 70 m), hotel "Sport" (23-floor; 85 m).

In the future, similar buildings were constructed in many oblast centers and large cities of the USSR:

1976 – 17-story, 62-meter hotel «Yalta" in Yalta.
1977 – 16-story, 58-meter hotel "Mayak" in Makiivka.
1979 – 15-story, 55-meter hotel "Zakarpattia" in Uzhgorod.
1980 – 21-story, 70-meter hotel "Gradetsky" in Chernihiv.
1986 – 19-story, 81-meter hotel "Luhansk" in Luhansk.

The tallest hotel built in Soviet times was the 27-storey "Tourist", a skyscraper with a height of 93 meters. The hotel was built from 1970 to 1987; 11 million rubles were spent on its construction. The building has 486 rooms, 250 parking spaces on two parking lots, and can comfortably accommodate 988 people. Even today this building is officially one of the highest hotels in Ukraine.

But the tallest hotel of the USSR was to become the "Parus" in Dnipro. According to the project, it had 32 floors and 114 meters in height. The 996-seat hotel might become a new symbol of the city and the south of the USSR. But since 1987, the pace of construction began to decline, and from 1995 it was completely stopped.

Soviet skyscrapers in period of 1969–1991 
In Soviet times, the construction of skyscrapers in the USSR was forbidden, but the buildings of 20–32 floors in some cases appeared in the largest cities of the country. In the 1970s and 1980s, Kyiv allowed the massive construction of residential buildings up to 22 floors.

The first residential 16-storey building in the Ukrainian Soviet Republic was built in 1965 at the corner of Zhilyanska and Velyka Vasylkivska streets in Kyiv (48 meters high, 60). Four years later, in 1969, the record house welcomed the first residents. Since then, the city has been regularly increasing its storeys.

In 1971, the first 18-storey residential building (54 meters, 148 apartments) appeared on Bogdan Khmelnytsky Street, 39. In 1975, they completed the construction of the Kyiv House of DATU – a 19-storey skyscraper, which at one time was one of the highest in the USSR.

The first Kharkiv residential skyscraper was built in 1979 – it was a residential complex on Poznańska Street, 2 (24 floors; 69.5 meters).

In addition to Kyiv and Kharkov, the Dnipro also became the city of skyscrapers. Pavel Nirinberg and a group of architects from the Dniprogromadproekt Institute have developed a project for a 31-storey residential complex.

On 12 June 1975, the first Dnipro skyscraper began to be built – dwelling houses on Peremoga Street ("Candles") (31st floor; 101 meters). Already in 1979, one "candle" was completed and filled with the first inhabitants. This skyscraper was not only the most storied of all, but also became the tallest skyscraper in Ukraine. In 1983, another such building grew, but two floors smaller. The designed third candle was never completed, laying the foundation only.

In 1974, the construction of a 120-meter skyscraper – the Aeroflot Computing Center (today the House of Ministry of Transport of Ukraine) began in Kyiv. In 1986,construction was completed and the building began to be used. In 2003, the skyscraper was reconstructed, giving it a more modern look.

Construction of the Trade House in Kyiv (97.5 m; 25 floors) continued from 1968 to 1981. For a  some time, the skyscraper held the first place as the tallest building in Kyiv. The State Tax Administration of Ukraine is now located in this building. Also, in 1981, a 20-story office center was built in Kyiv – today this is the House of Ministry of Labor and Social Relations (70 meters).

In 1989, Sevastopol also receive its own skyscraper – the building of the bureau "Muson" (14 floors; ~ 70 m), the building was shaped like a bottle of men's eau de Cologne known at that time, which is why it was called. The house is still the tallest in the city.

The same year, an impressive building was opened in Kyiv – the 27-story Vernadsky Library, one of the 10 largest libraries in the world. The height of the library-skyscraper is 79 meters.

The last Soviet Ukrainian skyscraper built can be considered a 23-storey building on Peoples' Friendship Square, 2-a (popularly called "Chamomile"), built in 1990, with a height of 92 meters. The architects of the building were L. Kolomiets, V. Katsin and V. Morozov.

In total, more than 730 16-storey buildings were built in the USSR in the 1970s, and 22,800 16-storey buildings and 450 skyscrapers over 16 floors in the 1980s.

Modern skyscrapers of Ukraine (since 1991) 
The first skyscraper that appeared in the days of independent Ukraine was the 97-meter House of the National Television Company of Ukraine in Kyiv, which was built from 1983 to 1992. Today it operates three TV channels: 1+1, UT-1 and TRK Ukraina.

Also, in the 1990s, 14–24 floors were massively built in the country, the highest of them being the 24-storeyed Kyiv floors on Heroes of Stalingrad, 16-B, nearly 90 meters high (built in 1994).

Kyiv 
Kyiv is the capital of Ukrainian skyscrapers: over two hundred 20–49 story buildings have been built in the last 10 years.

Both residential and office skyscraper construction is well developed in the city. Office high-rise buildings began to appear in Kyiv from the beginning of the 21st century. They spend more than $100,000,000 and several years work on their construction.

Residential skyscrapers are being built in special "bedroom suburbs" (although skyscrapers have begun to erect in historic sites of the city), most of them are concentrated in Poznyaki. There are such famous buildings as residential complex "Korona" and "Korona №2", which have 38 floors and 128 meters in height. It costs about $40,000,000 to build such homes.

In addition to office and residential skyscrapers, high-rise buildings are also being built in the city. For example, the construction of the most famous long-standing building – the Kiyv Court of Appeal – ended in 2006, construction lasted 28 years, and the unfinished skyscraper during this time was taken on the balance sheet of 9 different organizations. The completed skyscraper is 127 meters high.

Modern skyscrapers are also being built in the city – in 2014 the multifunctional complex "H-Tower" was opened, which is the highest hotel in Ukraine right now.

By a large margin, Kyiv is ahead of other Ukrainian cities in the number of houses that have 20 or more floors, their number exceeds 400, and this figure is increasing.

Dnipro 
The modern history of Dnipro skyscraper construction began in 1999, when the 30-storey "Towers" of 123 meters in height began to be laid. Architects Olexandr Dolnyk, Serhiy Pischany and Valentyn Bogmanov made skyscrapers so attractive that they twice received architectural awards. Construction of the Western Tower was completed in 2003, and the Eastern Tower in 2005. "Towers" remain the tallest buildings in Dnipro and a business card of the city.

In addition to the towers in Dnipro, such modern skyscrapers were built as:

 Residential complex "Letual" is a 21-storey skyscraper with a height of 79.6 meters, which has no analogues of its architecture in Ukraine. 
"Most-City Center" is an elite multifunctional skyscraper complex with 25-storey residential complex, 20-storey business center and 3-level shopping mall. The building is a symbol of the modernity and brightness of the city (the height of the skyscraper is 97.5 m). 
«Slavia" is a complex of residential buildings, consisting of 16 and 22-storey buildings, the height of the higher building is 89 meters. The total area of the building is 21276,3 m2.

In 2014, the large-scale construction of Multifunctional Complex "Brama" was to begin. The complex includes: the Brama Skyscraper, the 18-storey «Perehrestya» shopping and business center, the «Platforma» Shopping Center, the five-storey «Zigzag» and the three-storey «Klyn», which is a huge food complex. The main part of the complex, the 54-storey Brama Skyscraper was planned to start construction after the construction of «Perehrestya», but in 2014 the construction was frozen.

Donetsk 
In Donetsk, modern skyscrapers began to appear only in 2000s. The first skyscraper to cross the 100-meter mark was built in 2008, a 103.4-meter residential building on Illicha Avenue, 19a – this building remains one of the tallest in the city and adorns the famous avenue.

In 2008, the famous "Royal Tower" opened – a 29-story, 112-meter skyscraper is the tallest building in the city.

Over the few years of the early 2010s, several skyscrapers have been built in Donetsk and skyline skyscrapers have emerged. The most recent of these are: Congress Hall and Green Plaza, 23-storey Victoria Hotel, 26-storey Panoramic, and 110-meter North Business Center.

In total, since the mid-2000s, more than 20 buildings with 20 or more floors have been built in the city.

Kharkiv 
Since the early 2000s, skyscrapers over 20 floors began to be built in Kharkiv, as well, mostly as residential buildings. The first modern skyscraper in Kharkiv was «Olympus», a 26-story residential building built in 2005. It has 94 apartments and is 80 meters high.

In the future, more and more skyscrapers appeared in the city, and in 2004–2009 it was built: a 25-storey «Mir», a 22-storey «Triumph», a 25-storey «Pioneer», a 25-storey «Parus» and a 27-storey «Svitlyy Dim» – the tallest skyscraper in the city which is 97 meters high.

In 2009, a complex of two buildings was opened at once: the 25-storey «Ultra» Tower, one of the most prestigious residential complexes in Ukraine. At the end of 2010, a complex of three 27-storey towers was built – the residential complex "Monte Plaza", which stands 95 meters high. The complex is the largest and one of the highest in Kharkiv.

Large-scale project-construction of the 39-storey complex of residential complex «Europe» remains unrealized.

Odesa 
The history of Odesa skyscrapers began in the 2000s, when residential and office high-rise buildings began to be built en masse in the city. The first skyscraper to cross the 100-meter mark was the 25-storey residential complex «Kukurudza» (101 meters). Currently, the tallest building in the city is the 25-storey, 106-meter «Arc Palace №1» residential complex, built in 2008. At present in Odessa several dozen buildings have more than 20 floors; at least 20 homes are under construction.

Other cities 
Currently, the buildings of the upper 20 floors are also being built in Brovary, Chornomorsk, Mariupol, Vyshgorod, Kropyvnytskyi, Mykolaiv, Cherkasy and Truskavets. In these cities there are such famous skyscrapers as: «Karl Marx», 21-storey residential complex "Kupava", 20-storey residential complex on the Heroes of Stalingrad Street and the 26-storey "Olzhin Grad" in Vyshgorod. In 2017, the construction of the first buildings with more than 20 floors in Lviv and Khmelnitsky began. Several such buildings are planned to be built by 2020. There are also projects and concepts for the coming years, construction of 30-storey (and above) buildings is envisaged.

A 20-storey tower in Kropyvnytskyi remains unfinished. The fate of the building is currently unknown.

Many 14-19-story high-rises have been built and continue to be actively erected in many other regional centers and large cities of Ukraine.

The highest buildings in Ukraine

History of the highest buildings in Ukraine

References